Saint-Nicolas-de-Bliquetuit is a former commune in the Seine-Maritime department in the Normandy region in northern France. On 1 January 2016, it was merged into the new commune of Arelaune-en-Seine.

Geography
The 60m high Pont de Brotonne bridge was, until the middle of the last century, the first crossing point of the Seine.

Population

Places of interest
 The church of St. Nicholas, dating from the eleventh century.

See also
Communes of the Seine-Maritime department

References

Former communes of Seine-Maritime